Rosa María Vázquez Bustamante (born 5 August 1943) is a Mexican actress of film and television. A native of Tulancingo, Hidalgo, she made her film debut at the age of six in Emilio Fernández's The Torch (1950) starring Paulette Goddard and Pedro Armendáriz. She studied acting for three years at the National Association of Actors' Film Academy of Radio and Television, and was given her first starring role opposite Cantinflas in El padrecito (1964), her most famous film.

Selected filmography
The Torch (1950) (credited as Antonia Daneem)
El padrecito (1964)
La cigüeña distraída (1966)

References

External links

1943 births
Living people
Mexican film actresses
Mexican television actresses